Centre Democracy and Progress (CDP) was a centrist and Christian democratic political party in France. The party was founded in 1969 by centrists from the Democratic Centre (CD) who supported Gaullist Georges Pompidou in the 1969 presidential election, and joined the coalition of the cabinet of Prime Minister Jacques Chaban-Delmas.

Its goal was to influence the governmental policy in a pro-European, liberal and reformist direction. It supported the program of  Chaban-Delmas for the advent of a "New Society", where the relations between the social forces were based on dialogue and for a less control of the society by the state. The CDP supported the unsuccessful presidential candidacy of Chaban-Delmas in 1974 presidential election.

In the 1973 legislative election, the CDP won 23 seats.

In May 1976, CDP merged with the CD to form the Centre of Social Democrats (CDS), which in 1978 joined the Union for French Democracy (UDF).

See also
:Category:Centre Democracy and Progress politicians

References

1969 establishments in France
1976 disestablishments in France
Defunct political parties in France
Political parties established in 1969
Political parties disestablished in 1976
Political parties of the French Fifth Republic
Centrist parties in France
Christian democratic parties in Europe